Wine equalisation tax (WET) is a tax imposed on wine made, imported, or sold by wholesale in Australia. It is applied at 29% of the wholesale value of wine.

Background
In Australia, wine is taxed differently to other alcoholic beverages. While other beverages are taxed based on their alcohol content, wine is taxed at a flat 29% rate, which, on a per standard drink basis, generally makes tax on wine less than other alcoholic beverages.

Rebates
A number of rebates are available to wine producers based in Australia and New Zealand, with eligible produces originally able to claim up to $A500,000 annually. These rebates were introduced in 2004 and intended to assist small rural wineries. They were estimated to cost the Australian Federal Budget $A300 million in 2016.

Allegations of rorting
Following allegations of rorting, then Assistant Treasurer Josh Frydenberg announced in 2015 the establishment of a consultation group consisting of industry representatives to find solutions to the use of "contrived schemes" designed to exploit the rebate.

Reforms
In August 2017 reforms passed the Parliament of Australia which reduced the annual rebate available to $A350,000 and changed eligibility to require wine producers to grow at least 85% of the grapes used in their wine-making process.

References

Australian wine
Taxation in Australia
Value added taxes